The Gate of the Sun, also known as the Gateway of the Sun, is a monolith carved in the form of an arch or gateway at the site of Tiahuanaco by the Tiwanaku culture, an Andean civilization of Bolivia that thrived around Lake Titicaca in the Andes of western South America around 500-950 CE.

Its weight is estimated to be 10 tons. When rediscovered by European explorers in the mid-19th century, the megalith was lying horizontally and had a large crack through it. It presently stands in the location where it was found, although it is believed that this is not its original site, which remains uncertain.

Some elements of Tiwanaku iconography spread throughout Peru and parts of Bolivia.  Although there have been various modern interpretations of the mysterious inscriptions found on the object, the carvings that decorate the gate are believed to possess astronomical and/or astrological significance and may have served a calendrical purpose. In addition, scholars have found that the design below the central figure is meant to represent celestial cycles. Being a later monument to the site in which it stands, the Gateway of the Sun could have also represented a transition from lunar religion to a solar religion based on its positioning to the sun to the West.

Background 
The iconography of the Tiwanaku civilization in Bolivia was influential throughout the Andean region. The images found on the Gateway of the Sun can be recognized in other areas and associated with contemporaneous or later civilizations, such as the Wari and Inca. The Andean civilizations did not leave written records other than quipus (fiber recording devices) of their religious belief systems. Despite this, researchers have been able to gather information from the Spanish who documented the Incas, following their conquest of the empire. The Incas themselves had trained memorizers who were responsible for providing history through the oral traditions which the Spanish chroniclers used for their records. One of these chroniclers was a Felipe Guaman Poma de Ayala, who illustrated over 400 depictions of the Inca performing religious rituals and their stories. It is because of these drawings and sources similar to them that the ways of life for the ancient civilizations are not a mystery.

Pseudoarchaeology 
Among the early investigators of the Gate of the Sun were Arthur Posnansky and Edmund Kiss, who each interpreted this monument in the context of erroneous theories of an early contact with Nordic Aryans. Their interpretations lacked modern data and methods and are now regarded as pseudoarchaeology.

Figures 

The lintel is carved with 48 squares surrounding a central figure. Each square represents a character in the form of winged effigy. There are 32 effigies with human faces and 16 anthropomorphic figures with the heads of condors. All look towards the central motif: the figure of a person whose head is surrounded by 24 linear rays, thought by some to represent rays of the Sun. The styled staffs held by the figure apparently symbolize thunder and lightning. Some historians and archaeologists believe that the central figure represents the “Sun God” and others have linked it with the Inca god Viracocha. The image of the central figure on the gateway is thought to be Thunupa, or Tunupa, a major weather god in Aymara culture and in the Titicaca Basin throughout the Middle Horizon period. The deity is also known as the front-facing figure or Staff God and was believed to provide rain, lightning, and thunder to the Titicaca Basin. The mythological emergence of the creator gods from Lake Titicaca is the foundation of Tiwanaku religious belief, making the city of Tiwanaku a significant symbol for the whole Andes region. A central theme of Andean religion, including religion in the Inca Empire was the worship of gods that represented elements related to the Earth, especially for the Tiwanaku and Inca cultures. In Inca culture, the Sun God was known as Inti, depicted as a young boy holding various objects of gold. Scholars have drawn comparisons between the Inca and Tiwanaku icons as proof of Tiwanaku influence had on Inca mythology and iconography.

Historical depictions

References

External links 

Archaeological sites in Bolivia
Buildings and structures in La Paz Department (Bolivia)
Megalithic monuments
Tourist attractions in La Paz Department (Bolivia)
Tiwanaku culture